Northwest Airlines Corp. (NWA) was a major American airline founded in 1926 and absorbed into Delta Air Lines, Inc., by a merger. The merger, approved on October 29, 2008, made Delta the largest airline in the world until the American Airlines–US Airways merger on December 9, 2013. Northwest continued to operate under its own name and brand until the integration of the carriers was completed on January 31, 2010.

Northwest was headquartered in Eagan, Minnesota, near Minneapolis–Saint Paul International Airport. After World War II it became dominant in the trans-Pacific market with a hub in Tokyo, Japan (initially Haneda Airport, later Narita International Airport). In response to United Airlines' 1985 acquisition of Pan Ams' Pacific routes, Northwest paid $884 million to purchase Republic Airlines and then established fortress hubs at Detroit Metropolitan Wayne County Airport and Memphis International Airport. With this merger, NWA established the domestic network necessary to feed its well established Pacific routes. Lacking a significant presence in Europe, in 1993 it began a strategic alliance with KLM and a jointly coordinated European hub at Amsterdam Airport Schiphol.

Prior to its merger with Delta, Northwest was the world's sixth largest airline in terms of domestic and international scheduled passenger miles flown and the US's sixth largest airline in terms of domestic passenger miles flown. In addition to operating one of the largest domestic route networks in the U.S., Northwest carried more passengers across the Pacific Ocean (5.1 million in 2004) than any other U.S. carrier, and carried more domestic air cargo than any other American passenger airline.

Regional and commuter airline flights for Northwest were operated under the name Northwest Airlink by Big Sky Airlines, Eugene Aviation Services, Express Airlines I/II, Fischer Brothers Aviation, Mesaba Airlines, Northeast Express Regional Airlines, Pacific Island Aviation, Pinnacle Airlines, Precision Airlines, Simmons Airlines and Compass Airlines via respective code sharing agreements.   Northwest Airlines was also a minority owner of Midwest Airlines, holding a 40% stake in the company.

History

Beginnings
Northwest Airlines was founded on September 1, 1926, by Colonel Lewis Brittin, under the name Northwest Airways, a reference to the historical name for the Midwestern United States that derived from the Northwest Territory. Like other early airlines, Northwest's focus was not in hauling passengers, but in flying mail for the U.S. Post Office Department. The airline was originally based in Detroit, Michigan. The fledgling airline established a mail route between Minneapolis and Chicago, using open-cockpit biplanes such as the Curtiss Oriole and the Waco JYM. From 1928 the enclosed cabin six-passenger Hamilton H-45 and H-47 were used.

Northwest Airlines began carrying passengers in 1927; in 1928 Northwest started its first international route with service to Winnipeg. In 1929, a group headed by Richard Lilly, a businessman from St. Paul, Minnesota, purchased the airline.

In 1933 Northwest was selected to fly the "Northern Transcontinental Route" to Seattle, Washington. It adopted the name Northwest Airlines the following year after the Air Mail scandal. Northwest Airways, Inc. changed its name to Northwest Airlines, Inc. and the airline was incorporated under its new name in the State of Minnesota.

In 1939 Northwest had five daily flights from Chicago to Minneapolis; three continued west to Seattle through North Dakota and Montana. Northwest also served Winnipeg, Manitoba and Portland, Oregon by spurs from its transcontinental route.  By the spring of 1948, Northwest was operating three different aircraft types:  the 44-passenger seat Douglas DC-4, the 21-passenger seat Douglas DC-3 and the 36-passenger seat Martin 2-0-2.

Transpacific network development
In 1931 Northwest sponsored Charles and Anne Lindbergh on a pioneering test flight to Japan via Alaska, scouting what would become known as the Northwest Airlines' Great Circle route that could save  on a New York to Tokyo flight. Northwest began to bolster the infrastructure on the domestic leg of this route during World War II when it flew soldiers and supplies from the Northwestern United States to Alaska. It was at this point that Northwest began painting its airliners' tails bright red as a visual aid in the often harsh weather conditions. The airline's experience with the sub-arctic climate led the U.S. government to designate Northwest as the main airline over the North Pacific following the war.

In the spring of 1947, Northwest began stationing employees at Haneda Airport in Tokyo, flying them from the United States via Alaska on its Great Circle route. On July 15, 1947, Northwest was the first airline to begin direct service between the United States and Japan, using a Douglas DC-4 airliner named The Manila. (All pre-war airline service to the Orient had been via Hawaii and the Philippines.) The flight to Japan originated at Wold-Chamberlain Field in Minneapolis and stopped at Blatchford Field in Edmonton, Elmendorf AFB in Anchorage, and Shemya AAF in the western Aleutian Islands. The flight continued from Tokyo to Lunghwa Airport in Shanghai and then to Nichols Field at Manila.

A flight between Tokyo and Seoul (Gimpo Airport) began on October 20, 1947, and Naha Airport in Okinawa began to be a stop on the Tokyo to Manila route on November 16, 1947. Northwest service to Shanghai was suspended in May 1949 because of the civil war in China, with the Republic of China nearly ready to collapse, and its government evacuated to the island of Formosa (Taiwan). Northwest Airlines added Songshan Airport in Taipei, the new capital city of the Republic of China, as a stop on the Tokyo-Okinawa-Manila route on June 3, 1950, with ongoing interchange service to Hong Kong operated by Hong Kong Airways.

Northwest Orient Airlines

With transpacific flights established, Northwest began branding as Northwest Orient Airlines, although its registered corporate name remained "Northwest Airlines."

NWA continuously upgraded equipment on the transpacific routes. On June 22, 1949, Northwest received its first double-decker Boeing 377 "Stratocruiser", enabling more comfortable accommodations and faster transpacific flights. The Stratocruiser began flying from the West Coast to Honolulu in 1950 and to Tokyo via Alaska on September 27, 1952.　

In 1954 Northwest Orient purchased Douglas DC-6Bs and started flying them to Tokyo and Manila. In January 1960, Northwest was operating transcontinental Lockheed L-188 Electra turboprop service nonstop between New York City and Seattle with these flights being part of the airline's service between New York City and Asia with Douglas DC-7C aircraft being operated on the transpacific legs from Seattle and was also operating Electra propjet flights between Minneapolis/St. Paul, Milwaukee and Chicago Midway Airport in the north and several destinations in Florida in the south including Miami, Fort Lauderdale and Tampa.On July 8, 1960, Northwest placed the Douglas DC-8 into service, offering the shortest flight times to East Asia, but within a year the airline was negotiating the sale of the five DC-8s. Northwest retired the last of its Boeing 377 Stratocruisers that September. The airline purchased several Boeing 720Bs in 1961, and in 1963 several new Boeing 707-320Bs; for a time it adopted the slogan "Northwest Orient: The Fan-Jet Airline". Nonstop transpacific flights became feasible with the introduction of the 707-320B/C. Northwest bought its first Boeing 747s in 1970 and soon began retiring its smaller 707s. In addition to operating the 747's on transpacific flights, Northwest briefly flew them on its busiest domestic routes as well.

For years Northwest was the largest foreign airline serving Japan. In 1951 Northwest became involved with the founding of Japan Air Lines (JAL) by leasing airliners and crewmembers to the new airline. In 1952 United States and Japan ratified a regional bilateral aviation treaty, under which Northwest and Pan American World Airways became the two U.S. airlines at Tokyo. These carriers also received fifth freedom rights to carry passengers from and via Tokyo to other Asian destinations such as Seoul, Busan, Taipei, Kaohsiung, Manila, Beijing, Shanghai, Guangzhou, Hong Kong, Bangkok, Kuala Lumpur and Singapore. Northwest also flew passenger routes from Japan to Guam and Saipan, U.S. possessions in Micronesia.

Northwest's meteorologists, led by Dan Sowa, pioneered the first clear-air turbulence forecasting system in 1957, important since the airline flew many northern routes over turbulence-prone mountain areas. Northwest remained a leader in turbulence prediction, providing TPAWS (turbulence prediction and warning services) to other airlines.

Transatlantic and domestic expansion

During the regulated era, Northwest's domestic network was mainly along the northern transcontinental route through Chicago, Minneapolis, and Seattle; New York and Detroit were added in 1945. Northwest also served Hawaii from the West Coast, and, starting in 1958–59, Georgia and Florida from Chicago. On June 1, 1959, Northwest accepted its first turboprop, the L-188 Electra, from the Lockheed Corporation. Northwest Airlines started flying the three-engine Boeing 727-100 in November 1964; many stretched B727-251s followed.

After airline deregulation in 1978 Northwest began nonstop flights to other Asian cities, returned to China in 1984 after a 34-year hiatus, and strengthened its presence in the southwestern United States. It also began flying to the United Kingdom, Ireland, Germany, and Scandinavia. On May 21, 1984, shareholders in Northwest approved the creation of NWA Inc., a Delaware corporation that became the holding company of Northwest.

On October 1, 1986, Northwest merged with Republic Airlines, also based in Minneapolis-St. Paul. It was the largest airline merger at the time and caused operational issues which led the combined carrier to have an on-time performance of just 42 percent in its early days. Through the merger, NWA adopted Republic's three-hub domestic network centered around Detroit, Memphis, and Minneapolis-St. Paul. The combined airline became particularly strong in the first two cities, with a market share of over 80% in each. After the merger, the airline dropped Orient from its branding. One major reason for the merger was that Northwest's unique position as a domestic and transpacific carrier had been challenged in 1985 when United Airlines acquired the Pacific Division of Pan Am.

Northwest continued to use the pre-merger Northwest Orient livery (minus the word "Orient") until a new livery and identity (designed by Landor Associates) were adopted in 1989. The new livery, nicknamed the "bowling shoe" by employees, featured colors of red, white, gray, and very dark blue.

Also in 1989, Northwest became the launch customer of the Boeing 747-400 and became one of only two airlines in the United States to operate it until its merger with Delta in 2009. The first aircraft it purchased was the first 747-400 to be built; it was later involved in a loss-of-control incident in 2002 and placed on display at the Delta Flight Museum following its retirement by Delta in 2015.

Northwest was purchased in a 1989 leveraged buyout by an investment group headed by Al Checchi, Fred Malek and Gary Wilson, with KLM, and many others. To pay off the debt incurred, the new management sold many of the airline's aircraft to leasing companies, and sold property around the world, including land in central Tokyo. The expense of the buyout was so great that in 1993, following several years of losses due to industry overcapacity and a traffic downturn following the Gulf War, Northwest threatened bankruptcy unless its employee groups agreed to three years of wage cuts. After signing the concessionary agreements, Northwest made its first profit since 1989.

Also in 1993, Northwest began its strategic alliance with KLM, which was the largest airline partnership at that time. This partnership eventually became the Wings Alliance, but the alliance never grew beyond the two airlines. Northwest gradually pulled out of its minor European destinations and focused on domestic and Asian markets.

On May 1, 1996, Northwest inaugurated the first-ever nonstop service from North America to China, Detroit–Beijing. Nonstop Detroit–Shanghai service followed in April 2000. Later, these nonstop services were suspended in 2002 due to the outbreak of severe acute respiratory syndrome (SARS). Northwest then served these routes via Tokyo. The airline sought government approval to restore nonstop Detroit–Shanghai service in March 2007 but lost its bid to United's Washington–Beijing route; however, before their merger with Delta Air Lines, Northwest received tentative authority to restart nonstop Detroit–Shanghai service starting March 25, 2009.

Through the late 1990s and early 2000s (decade), Northwest enjoyed profits and focused on improving technology to increase convenience and reduce costs. The airline offered airport self-service check-in kiosks starting in 1997 and had more than any other airline. Northwest was the first large U.S. airline to offer passengers internet check-in, with service from December 2000. During the early 2000s (decade), Northwest acquired a reputation of refusing to adopt industry-wide fare increases that had been accepted by other airlines. This changed in March 2005, when Northwest adopted fare hikes in response to rising oil prices.

Due to competition from low-cost carriers such as Southwest Airlines and increased labor costs resulting from a new contract with employees represented by the Aircraft Mechanics Fraternal Association (AMFA) labor union, Northwest began to make cutbacks in early 2001. Two small rounds of employee layoffs and other cutbacks were implemented in the months prior to the September 11 terrorist attacks. Following the attacks, Northwest was forced to make dramatic changes to its business structure through major employee layoffs and other cost-cutting measures. The retirement of costly and aging aircraft such as the Boeing 727 and McDonnell Douglas DC-10-40 were accelerated as new aircraft went into service. In addition, the airline pursued options to reduce costs across the board, including removing pillows, peanuts, pretzels, in-flight entertainment on domestic flights, and newspapers and magazines. Over 50 McDonnell Douglas DC-9, Boeing 757, Boeing 747, and Airbus A320 family aircraft were withdrawn from use in an attempt to lower overall capacity and save money. Some of these aircraft were returned to service.

Following many years of a pioneering and close partnership with KLM Royal Dutch Airlines, Northwest, along with partners KLM and Continental Airlines joined SkyTeam, an airline alliance of ten airlines from around the world, on September 15, 2004. This was partially a result of Air France merging with KLM, forming the Air France-KLM group. The airline continued to hemorrhage money, however.

Bankruptcy filing
Despite far-reaching money saving initiatives, Northwest was forced to file for Chapter 11 bankruptcy protection for the first time in its 79-year history. The filing took place in the U.S. Bankruptcy Court for the Southern District of New York on September 14, 2005. With Northwest's filing, four of the six largest U.S. carriers were operating under bankruptcy protection. Northwest joined Delta Air Lines (which filed just minutes before), United Airlines, and US Airways in bankruptcy. All four carriers subsequently emerged from bankruptcy protection. Northwest common stock shares dropped more than 50% for the second time in three days following the news, largely because the stock is generally canceled as part of the bankruptcy process. In the following weeks, Northwest Airlink carriers Mesaba Airlines and Pinnacle Airlines both announced that Northwest Airlines had missed payments to them for their Airlink flying. Northwest also announced plans to shrink its Airlink fleet by over 45 aircraft. Mesaba Aviation filed for Chapter 11 Bankruptcy on October 13, 2005.

 Northwest announced on May 18, 2007, that shares of the company would begin to trade on the NYSE under the ticker NWA. Initial trading on a "when-issued" basis began on May 21, 2007, and regular trading began on May 31, 2007. Also on May 18, 2007, Northwest Airlines was cleared by a federal bankruptcy judge to emerge from Chapter 11 Bankruptcy protection on May 31, 2007, ending Northwest's 20 months of difficulty trying to slash costs.

On July 16, 2007, Northwest Airlines applied to the United States Department of Transportation for nonstop service between its WorldGateway hub at Detroit to Shanghai (beginning in 2007 on Boeing 747-400s) and to Beijing (beginning in 2010 on Boeing 787 Dreamliners). The airline faced off against Delta Air Lines (which proposed Atlanta to Shanghai and Beijing), American Airlines (Chicago/O'Hare–Beijing), Continental Airlines (Newark–Shanghai), US Airways (Philadelphia–Beijing), United Airlines (Los Angeles–Shanghai and San Francisco–Guangzhou), and MAXjet (Seattle–Shanghai) in the route competition.

On August 12, 2007, Northwest Airlines became a passive investor in the purchase of Midwest Airlines by TPG Capital. The airline stated that while it was an investor, it would not participate in any management or control of Midwest Airlines. However, on August 14, 2007, AirTran Airways raised their offer for Midwest to $16.25 a share, 25 cents more than the TPG offer. But soon after on August 17, 2007, TPG Capital raised their offer to $17.00 a share which sealed the deal. Northwest Airlines became a minority owner of Midwest Airlines in the fourth quarter of 2007.

On September 25, 2007, Northwest Airlines received DOT approval to begin service to Shanghai from its Detroit hub beginning March 25, 2009. American, Continental, Delta, and US Airways also received new or additional China route authority to Shanghai or Beijing, and United received authority to serve Guangzhou.

Merger with Delta Air Lines

On April 14, 2008, Northwest Airlines announced that it would be merging with Delta Air Lines to form the world's largest airline. The merger was approved on October 29, 2008. The CEO during the merger of Delta and Northwest was Richard Anderson who was Northwest Airlines CEO from 2001 to 2004.  The combined airline uses the Delta name and branding. On October 1, 2009, Northwest WorldPerks merged into SkyMiles. On January 31, 2010, Delta completed the merge of the reservation systems and discontinued using the Northwest name for flights. The official last flight was Northwest Airlines Flight 2470 from Los Angeles, California to Las Vegas, Nevada.

NWA Cargo
As of 2006, Northwest Airlines Cargo was the largest cargo carrier among U.S. combination passenger and cargo airlines. NWA Cargo's fleet of dedicated  freighter aircraft flew from some key cities in the United States and East Asia, as well as Amsterdam, connecting with the carrier's cargo hub in Anchorage, Alaska (Ted Stevens Anchorage International Airport), facilitating the quick transfer of cargo between large cities on both sides of the Pacific. NWA Cargo also transports freight aboard the passenger fleet of Northwest Airlines to more than 250 cities worldwide. Delta announced that the NWA Cargo hub will be shut down by the end of 2009. As of early 2008, NWA's largest cargo client was DHL International. In December 2007, NWA announced that DHL International would terminate its cargo agreement with the airline effective late 2008. According to NWA Chief Financial Officer Dave Davis, the loss of its largest cargo client would bring significant changes to the division. Further changes to the NWA Cargo division continued into 2009 as it was merged into the Delta Cargo service. NWA Cargo ended all operations on December 28, 2009. On July 30, 2010, Northwest pleaded guilty to one count of felony price fixing for fixing prices for cargo shipping via NWA Cargo.

Corporate affairs and identity

Headquarters

Immediately before Northwest ceased being an independent airline, its headquarters was in Building A, a facility in Eagan, Minnesota, near Minneapolis-St. Paul International Airport and the intersection of I-35E and Interstate 494. The  building in the complex, which housed about 1,000 Northwest employees, was built in 1985. The building had a large "N" painted on the roof.

After Delta and Northwest merged, Delta moved the Eagan headquarters employees to other offices in the Minneapolis–Saint Paul area. In October 2009 Delta Air Lines hired a real estate broker to put the  former Northwest Airlines headquarters complex for sale or for lease. During that month the facility had a taxable value of $13.7 million. The airline marketed  of the former NWA facility that is located along Interstate 494 separately from the main part of the property, as the airline considered the property to be excess. Terry Kingston, the executive director of the real estate brokerage firm Cushman & Wakefield, stated that there had been some interest in the Northwest Airlines property from other parties. Northwest was the only occupant of the four-story headquarters building. Employees remaining in the Minneapolis area were moved to Building C, the former Republic Airlines headquarters building, located on the property of Minneapolis-St. Paul International Airport, as well as Building J located in Eagan.

Before the headquarters were in Eagan, they were on the grounds of Minneapolis–St. Paul International Airport.

Labor relations

A recurring issue in Northwest's history was its troubled labor relations. In 1998, Northwest walked away from the bargaining table, locked out its pilots (represented by the Air Line Pilots Association, International) and shut down the airline for more than two weeks. The airline sustained heavy losses as a result, and ended 1998 in the red, after being profitable since 1993.

On January 5, 2000, Northwest Airlines filed a federal lawsuit against the flight attendants' union and a number of rank-and-file employees. Along with its January 5 complaint, Northwest Airlines filed a motion for discovery, requesting searches of the hard drives of the office and home computers of union officials. Additionally, Northwest requested searches of the home computers of rank-and-file employees, including Kevin Griffin and Frank Reed. On February 8, Minnesota District Court Judge Boylan approved the request and issued the discovery order. The order required all 43 named defendants, officers and rank-and-file members to turn over both home and office computer equipment to the accounting company Ernst & Young for "purposes of examining and copying information and communications contained on the computer hard drives." The order permitted the discovery of all data, including e-mail communications. After conducting discovery, Northwest Airlines fired over a dozen employees in early March, stating that they had engaged in a sickout. The Union filed grievances claiming none of the employees' sick calls were false. The effect on intra-airline email use was marked: postings critical of Northwest Airlines by employees dwindled, and the majority of messages after the search were posted anonymously.

On August 20, 2005, after months of negotiations, an impasse declared by the NMB and a 30-day cooling off period, the over 4,750 Northwest aircraft mechanics, janitors, and aircraft cleaners represented by AMFA went on strike against the company. After numerous negotiation sessions, no agreement was reached, and the company began hiring permanent replacement workers. In mid-October, after permanently hiring about 500 non-union workers, Northwest made a final offer to the union. The offer would have saved 500 union jobs and offered four weeks of severance pay to terminated employees. This offer was worse than the original declined by the union, which would have saved over 2,000 jobs and offered 16 weeks of severance pay. On October 20, 2005, AMFA announced that it would not allow its members to vote on the offer, citing that parts of the contract would violate the union's commitment to its members. Finally, in late December 2005, Northwest made what it termed its "final offer" to the union. The agreement would have terminated all striking workers and given them rights to unemployment compensation. The union voted down the offer. On October 9, 2006, AMFA leadership and Northwest reached an agreement. Under the settlement, all AMFA workers still on strike as of that date will be converted to lay-off status with 5 weeks of severance pay (10 weeks if they resign from Northwest). However, these employees will have a right of recall to their old jobs. Approval of the settlement was on November 6, 2006.

On May 30, 2007, it was announced that the flight attendants narrowly agreed to concessions and became the last major workgroup at Northwest to agree to new contract terms. The deal was approved by a vote of 2,966 to 2,862. Union leaders said that 90.5 percent of eligible voters cast ballots. The new contract would provide Northwest with $1957 million in annual cuts through 2011.

Negotiations with attendants had been ongoing and contentious for several years. The flight attendants were unable to strike during negotiations because of a court injunction and the refusal of the mediation board to release them from bargaining which would have allowed the setting of a strike deadline. The attendants had been working under imposed pay cuts and work rules since July 2006 when a previous tentative agreement was rejected by 55 percent of the voting members.

Prior to the May 2007 agreement, union leaders had expressed concern that its defeat could prompt the National Mediation Board to recess talks indefinitely, resulting in the loss of a $182 million bankruptcy claim the attendants had against Northwest. With the new agreement, the $182 million claim was to eventually be sold for cash with an estimated pre-tax value of $15,000 to $18,000 per flight attendant. Other labor unions at Northwest received similar claims as part of their concessionary agreements.

Previous to the recent agreements, Northwest provided employees with stock in exchange for concessions. For example, In 1993 Northwest's pilots, ground workers and flight attendants received stock and seats on the board of directors in exchange for pay cuts. As part of the agreement, Northwest was supposed to buy back these preferred shares in 2003 but refused to do so citing financial distress. Flight attendants, ground workers and mechanics still holding those preferred shares received shares of new Northwest stock (estimated at a combined value of $277 million).

In the summer of 2007, Northwest was engaged in a labor conflict with its pilots over a large number of end of the month flight cancellations. The pilots claimed that Northwest did not have sufficient pilots to fly its schedule; Northwest accused the pilots of calling in sick to create the problem. The dispute was resolved with a new agreement with ALPA in August 2007 in which pilots would be compensated for overtime. Northwest also began hiring new pilots to alleviate the pilot shortages they faced throughout the summer of 2007.

Destinations

Following the Republic merger in 1986, Northwest primarily operated on a hub and spoke route system with hubs in Detroit, Memphis, Minneapolis/St. Paul, and Tokyo. Under the KLM joint venture started in 1993, the two carriers established an Amsterdam hub where transatlantic routes operated by Northwest linked with European, African, and Asian routes operated by KLM. Northwest also operated a few routes outside this hub system, such as flights from the west coast to Honolulu.

In the mid-1980s, Northwest operated the only U.S. flag carrier service to Glasgow, Oslo, and Stockholm, as well as service to Copenhagen (the latter three cities are due to Minneapolis's large Nordic population). However, this was later withdrawn after several years. From April 2000, Northwest operated non-stop flights from Detroit to Milan and Rome, both were later withdrawn (from 2003 to 2005 Rome was served only during the summer season). In 2009 under the banner of Delta, service to Rome was then resumed for the summer season.

In 1991, Northwest began service to Australia, after United and Qantas began non-stop flights to the continental U.S. using the newly introduced, long-range 747-400. Northwest routed its Sydney–New York flight through Osaka, which raised Japanese protest because less than 30% of passengers on the Australia–Japan segment were originating in the U.S.

On May 1, 1996, Northwest began the first-ever non-stop service from North America to mainland China, from Detroit to Beijing, three times a week.  From 1996 until 2002, Northwest operated nonstop flights from its Detroit hub to Beijing and Shanghai. Eventually, these routes were suspended. When that happened, Northwest operated these routes from Detroit with a connection at its Tokyo–Narita hub. However, on July 16, 2007, Northwest re-applied with the US Department of Transportation for nonstop service between Detroit and both Beijing and Shanghai. On September 25, 2007, the US Department of Transportation tentatively awarded authority to Northwest for a new Detroit to Shanghai (Pudong) route effective March 25, 2009. The route was to be flown using the Boeing 747-400 until the Boeing 787 Dreamliner aircraft became available, however, the Detroit–Shanghai nonstop route was taken over by Delta on October 24, 2009, using its Boeing 777-200ER and Boeing 777-200LR aircraft after Delta ended nonstop service between Atlanta and Shanghai due to weak customer demand. The Detroit-Beijing nonstop route was later launched by the merged Delta using a Boeing 777-200ER on July 1, 2011.

In 2008, Northwest was one of several U.S. airlines to receive permission from the British government to fly into Heathrow Airport in London after previously having to use Gatwick Airport. Northwest began service to Heathrow from its hubs in Detroit and Minneapolis, as well as starting Seattle-London service. However, after being acquired by Delta in 2008, the Seattle route was dropped in January 2009 so the Heathrow landing slot and aircraft used could be redeployed to a more profitable route. In 2009, the Heathrow routes from the Detroit and Minneapolis hubs were taken over by Delta using its Boeing 767-400ER aircraft.

Northwest Airlines also served more Canadian cities than any other U.S. carrier including Calgary, Edmonton, Kitchener/Waterloo, London (ON), Montréal-Dorval, Ottawa, Quebec City, Regina, Saskatoon, Thunder Bay, Toronto-Pearson, Vancouver, and Winnipeg. Seasonal service was also offered to smaller Canadian cities.

Codeshare agreements
Northwest Airlines had codeshare agreements with the following airlines as of March 2009:

Fleet

At the time of the merger with Delta Air Lines, Northwest had a total of 320 aircraft with seven on order. It was also the last U.S. passenger airline to have a dedicated cargo fleet and cargo-only routes. The Northwest fleet was integrated into Delta's fleet on December 31, 2009.

Northwest operated a mixed fleet of Boeing, McDonnell Douglas, and Airbus aircraft whereas Delta operated just Boeing and McDonnell Douglas aircraft. The Boeing 757 was the only type common to the pre-merger fleets of both Delta and Northwest.

As part of a major fleet renewal program, Northwest introduced a simplified new paint scheme and logo in 2003. The airline replaced its McDonnell Douglas DC-10 airliners with the Airbus A330. The first Airbus A330-300, used initially for European flights, arrived on August 6, 2003. Northwest Airlines also possessed the youngest trans-Atlantic fleet of any North American or European airline. Northwest Airlines also began flying reconfigured Boeing 757-200 airliners on some of its European flights carrying fewer passengers. Northwest was one of only two passenger airlines in the United States to fly the Boeing 747-400, the other being United Airlines.  A number of Boeing 747-400 aircraft formerly operated by Northwest were then also flown by Delta following the merger of the two air carriers including the first B747-400 ever built with this aircraft currently on public display at the Delta Flight Museum located at Hartsfield-Jackson Atlanta International Airport (ATL).

Northwest was looking for manufacturers to discuss the replacement of their 100, 110 and 125 seat McDonnell Douglas DC-9 (DC-9-10, DC-9-30 and DC-9-50) aircraft, with an average age of 35 years.

Cabin
In March 1988, Northwest Airlines announced that it would ban smoking on all flights within North America, effective April 23, 1988, on the same day that a rule from the U.S. federal government prohibiting smoking on all domestic flights of a duration of two hours or fewer, would take into effect. Northwest was the first major U.S. airline to enact a smoking ban since the airline Muse Air had ended its four-year smoking ban in 1985.

World Business Class
World Business Class was Northwest Airlines' international business class product. It was offered on all widebody aircraft. Seats had 60 inches of pitch and 176 degrees of recline. Passengers aboard this class received free meals and refreshments, including alcoholic beverages. All seats were equipped with Audio-Video-On-Demand (AVOD), universal power-ports, a moveable reading light, a folding work table, and a swivel cocktail table.

Domestic First Class
 First Class was offered on all narrowbody aircraft, as well as CRJ-900 Northwest Airlink flights operated by Mesaba Airlines and E175 flights operated by Compass Airlines. Seats ranged from 19.5 to 21.5 inches wide, and had between 34 and 37 inches of pitch. Passengers aboard this class received complimentary meals, refreshments, and alcoholic beverages.

International Economy Class
Economy Class was offered on all widebody aircraft. Seats ranged from 17 to 17.5 inches wide, and had between 31 and 34 inches of pitch. Passengers aboard this class received free meals, snacks, and non-alcoholic beverages. Beer and wine were complimentary on international flights with complimentary meals, other alcoholic beverages could be purchased for a fee.

Passengers aboard Airbus A330 aircraft also had an Audio-Video-On-Demand (AVOD) system located in the seatback in front of them, and passengers seated in rows 10–23 (A330-200) or rows 10–28 (A330-300) had a universal power-port located below their seat.

Domestic Economy Class
Economy Class was offered on all narrowbody aircraft. Seats ranged from 17 to 17.5 inches wide and had between 30 and 34 inches of pitch, the same as on international economy class. Passengers aboard this class received free refreshments. In latter years in lieu of complimentary prepared meals snack boxes, sandwiches (on select flights), and light snacks were available for purchase as part of a buy on board program. Alcoholic beverages were also sold.

Before 2008, Northwest Airlines was the only major U.S. airline (aside from low-cost, short-haul Southwest Airlines, Allegiant Air and Spirit Airlines) to not offer any in-flight entertainment within North America (including Alaska). Although several of the airline's domestic aircraft were originally equipped with in-flight entertainment systems, these were removed in 2005 to cut costs. US Airways implemented a similar initiative in 2008. On flights between Honolulu International Airport and Minneapolis-Saint Paul International Airport, passengers experienced the same cabin as International Economy Class aboard Airbus A330 aircraft.

WorldPerks
 
Northwest Airlines' frequent-flyer program, WorldPerks, offered regular travelers the ability to obtain free tickets, First Class upgrades on flights, discounted membership for its airport lounges (WorldClubs), or other types of rewards. Customers could accumulate miles from actual flight segments flown or through Northwest's partners, such as car rental companies, hotels, credit cards, and other vendors. WorldPerks' elite tiers were Silver Elite, Gold Elite, and Platinum elite which allowed for more mileage bonuses, priority waitlists and standby, and other benefits. Over the years, some details of the program changed, such as introducing capacity-controlled awards (only a certain number of seats allocated for free travel), expiration of account if no activity occurred in three years, a requirement of a Saturday-night stay for domestic coach awards, waiving of capacity controls for awards but requiring double the number of miles for redemption, and adding several partner airlines for mileage accumulation and award redemption. The original name of the WorldPerks program was the Northwest Orient Airlines Free Flight Plan, which began in 1981. The original program used paper coupons and gave credit for flight segments. Upon renaming the program to "WorldPerks" in 1986, a mileage-based system was used.

In addition to its Northwest Airlink and SkyTeam alliance partnerships, Northwest offered frequent flyer partnerships with the following airlines:

Northwest also offered frequent flyer partnerships with the following car rental agencies:

WorldClubs

WorldClubs was Northwest's member lounge. Members had reciprocal access to a number of other clubs, including fellow SkyTeam carriers such as KLM, Delta Air Lines and Air France. Northwest also had partnerships with various other airline lounges on an airport-by-airport basis. Unlike some other airline lounges, WorldClubs offered free alcoholic beverages in domestic locations and Tokyo-Narita. Northwest also offered free Wi-Fi internet access worldwide.

Locations
The following airports had Northwest Airlines WorldClub locations:

Boston
Chicago O'Hare
Detroit (4)
Honolulu
London (Heathrow)(SkyTeam Lounge)
Los Angeles
Manila
Memphis
Milwaukee
Minneapolis-St. Paul (2)
Newark
New York (La Guardia)
Portland, OR
San Francisco
Seattle/Tacoma
Tokyo (Narita) (2)
Washington (Dulles)
Washington (Reagan)

Incidents and accidents

Fatal accidents
The following are major incidents and accidents that occurred on Northwest's mainline aircraft.

Non-fatal accidents and incidents
  Pilots who flew over the scene also praised the Northwest crew, calling it the "...finest ditching they had ever seen..." .

 

November 20, 1992.  A 727 lost hydraulic power and made an emergency landing in Detroit with only engine power to steer the plane.

See also 
 List of defunct airlines of the United States
 Professional Flight Attendants Association

References

Bibliography
 Roach, J and Eastwood A.B., Jet Airliner Production List - Volume 1 - Boeing. 2003. The Aviation Hobby Shop. .

Further reading
 El-Hai, Jack. (2013) Non-stop: A Turbulent History of Northwest Airlines (University of Minnesota Press, 2013) 291 pp. Heavily illustrated.
Ruble, Kenneth D.; (1986). Flight to the Top: How a Hometown Airline Made History—and Keeps on Making It: The Absorbing Sixty-year Story of Northwest Airlines. New York: Viking Press.
"Pilots Who Flew Drunk are Sentenced to Prison". (October 27, 1990). St. Louis Post-Dispatch, p. 7A. Retrieved March 21, 2005, from LexisNexis.
Moylan, Martin J. "NWA to trim mechanics jobs". (March 17, 2005). Detroit Free Press.
Northwest Airlines history timeline on www.nwa.com
U.S. Postal Service history; airmail service starts
"Order 2006-2-1", Joint Application of Alitalia-Linee Aeree Italiane-S.p.A., Czech Airlines, Delta Air Lines, Inc., KLM Royal Dutch Airlines, Northwest Airlines, Inc. and Societe Air France for Approval of and Antitrust Immunity for Alliance Agreements, United States Department of Transportation, February 6, 2006.
Extensive archival records of Northwest Airlines are available for research use at the Minnesota Historical Society.

External links

Northwest Airlines (Archive)
WorldTraveler inflight magazine
Former timetable and cost

 
Airlines for America members
Airlines established in 1926
Airlines disestablished in 2010
Companies based in Eagan, Minnesota
Companies that filed for Chapter 11 bankruptcy in 2005
Defunct airlines of the United States
Defunct companies based in Minnesota
Delta Air Lines
Economy of Memphis, Tennessee
Economy of Michigan
Price fixing convictions
Wayne County, Michigan
Former SkyTeam members
1926 establishments in Michigan
2010 disestablishments in Minnesota
American companies established in 1926